Chamelania is a genus of moths belonging to the family Tortricidae.

Species
Chamelania auricoma Razowski & Pelz, 2003
Chamelania jaliscana Razowski, 2001

See also
List of Tortricidae genera

References

 , 2005: World Catalogue of Insects vol. 5 Tortricidae.
 , 2001, SHILAP revista de lepidopterologia 29: 276.

External links
tortricidae.com

Euliini
Tortricidae genera